Andrés Gerard Jr. (born 16 October 1949) is a Mexican sailor. He competed in the Star event at the 1968 Summer Olympics.

References

External links
 

1949 births
Living people
Mexican male sailors (sport)
Olympic sailors of Mexico
Sailors at the 1968 Summer Olympics – Star
Place of birth missing (living people)